Afro-Cubans are Cubans who are of Black African ancestry. The term may also refer to:

In music
Afro-Cuban (album), a 1955 album by Kenny Dorham
Afro-Cubans (band), a Latin jazz band founded by Machito in 1940

See also
Cabildo (Cuba)
Emancipados
Haitian Cuban